"Gentlemen, history returns" (Hebrew: "רבותי, ההיסטוריה חוזרת" is a Hebrew song, written by Haim Hefer and composed by Shmual Parsheko during last stages of the 1948 Israeli Arab war. It was first performed by Yafa Yarkoni during the war in front of the Israeli troops, later it was also performed by Yehoram Gaon, Shoshana Damari and the central command band. The song describes events in the Panmach from its establishment until its dismantlement into the Israel Defense Forces. It is sung in Palmach reunions and during the Israeli Remembrance day.

Lyrics

Themes and content

The song is designed as a monologue spoken by an ageing grandmother and her grandson. The grandmother, a veteran of the Palmach bridged, describe to her grandson events taken place during her service in the Palmach.

In the first verse the song describes the participation of the Palmach in the British led in invasion to Syria during World War II.

In the second verse the song describe the participation of the Palmach in the battles of El Alamein the Western Desert, it also describe the plan to defend the Jewish settlement in Palestine from the Nazi Afrika Korps in case of a British withdrawal from Egypt with improvised weapons.

In the third verse the grandmother describes the role of the Palmach member as a handy substitute for every work in the kibbutz.

In the fourth verse the song describes the assassination of British minister of state in the Middle East, Lord Moyne by the Lehi organization. Fearing British retribution against the Yishuv the Palmach opened a campaign to neutralize the dissenting militant Jewish organizations – the Irgun and the Lahi. The campaign was named by these organizations the Saison or "The Hunting Season".

In the fifth verse the grandmother is beater for the dismantling of the Palmach with the establishment of the state of Israel. The phrase: "the Kushi can already go, Since the Kushi did the work." (Kushi is the Hebrew word for a black African man) originate from a quote by Friedrich Schiller`s play "Fiesco".

External links 

 "Gentlemen, history returns" performed by Tova Porat 

Songs of the 1948 Arab–Israeli War